The Michigan Formation is a geologic formation in Michigan. It preserves fossils dating back to the Mississippian period.

References
 

Carboniferous Michigan
Mississippian United States